Verkhneuralsky (masculine), Verkhneuralskaya (feminine), or Verkhneuralskoye (neuter) may refer to:
Verkhneuralsky District, a district of Chelyabinsk Oblast, Russia
Verkhneuralskoye Urban Settlement, a municipal formation which the Town of Verkhneuralsk in Verkhneuralsky District of Chelyabinsk Oblast, Russia is incorporated as